Terry O'Sullivan (July 7, 1915 – September 14, 2006) was an American actor, best known for his role on the soap opera Search for Tomorrow as Arthur Tate (1952–1955, 1956–1966).

Career 
In the Arthur Tate role, he received the TV-Radio Mirror Award for Best Daytime Drama Actor three years in a row (1953–1955). When his character was written out of Search for Tomorrow, he played the role of Richard Hunter on Days of Our Lives (1966–68). He also played Judge Sam Stevens on The Secret Storm (1968–1969) before officially retiring from television roles in 1970 and relocating to Minnetonka, Minnesota.

Death
O'Sullivan died of pancreatic cancer in St. Paul, Minnesota.

References

1915 births
2006 deaths
Male actors from Kansas City, Missouri
American male soap opera actors
American male television actors
People from Minnetonka, Minnesota
Deaths from pancreatic cancer
Deaths from cancer in Minnesota
20th-century American male actors